Ugandan coup d'état may refer to:

1985 Ugandan coup d'état
1974 Uganda coup d'état attempt
1971 Ugandan coup d'état